= The Deadline Effect =

2021 book by Christopher Cox

The Deadline Effect: How to Work Like It's the Last Minute-Before the Last Minute
- First edition (UK)
- Author: Christopher Cox
- Language: English
- Publisher: Avid Reader
- Publication date: July 2021
- ISBN: 978-1982132279

The Deadline Effect: How to Work Like It's the Last Minute-Before the Last Minute is a book by New York-based journalist Christopher Cox, published by Avid Reader in July 2021. Reviews of this volume have been published in many peak media including The Wall Street Journal, Financial Times, The New Yorker, and Time. Based on both academic knowledge and narratives of organizational cases, the book provides a theory for understanding the mental dynamics imposed by pending deadlines, covering commonly associated fears.
